Nausikaya (Nausikaja) is a 1995 Croatian film directed, written and produced by Vicko Ruić. It is based on "The Spider", a horror short story by Hanns Heinz Ewers. The film was selected as the Croatian entry for the Best Foreign Language Film at the 69th Academy Awards, but was not accepted as a nominee.

Cast
 Nada Gačešić as Marija Slajner (as Nada Gacesic-Livakovic)
 Igor Serdar as Matija Remetin
 Maja Nekić as Nausikaja
 Mustafa Nadarević as Inspector Stevovic

See also
 List of submissions to the 69th Academy Awards for Best Foreign Language Film
 List of Croatian submissions for the Academy Award for Best Foreign Language Film

References

External links
 

1995 films
Serbo-Croatian-language films
Films based on short fiction
Croatian drama films
Films set in 1939
Films set in Zagreb
1995 directorial debut films
1995 drama films